Louis de Robert (5 March 1871, Paris – 27 September 1937) was a French writer, winner of the prix Femina in 1911.

He became friends with Émile Zola during the Dreyfus Affair and took a stand for the revision of the trial.

A regular collaborator in The Journal, with Jules Renard, Alphonse Allais, Octave Mirbeau, he was the first reader of the proofs of Du côté de chez Swann, and dissuaded his friend Marcel Proust to shorten his novel.

He won the Prix of the Académie française

Fallen in love with the thirty years younger Jeanne Humbert, he married her at the town hall of Sannois on November 8, 1928. She survived him more than half a century and published her autobiography Le cœur a ses raisons in 1986, on vanity press.

Works 
1894: Un tendre
1896: Papa.
1896: Fragiles.
1897: The eternal enigma. Yvette Guilbert, New-York city
1898: La Première Femme
1900: La Reprise
1901: Le Mauvais Amant
1901: Le Partage du cœur
1911: Le Roman du malade (Prix Fémina)
1912: L'envers d'une courtisane
1918: Le Prince amoureux.
1921: Réussir
1921: Reconnais-toi
1922: Silvestre et Monique
1924: Paroles d'un solitaire.
1925: Octavie
1925: Comment débuta Marcel Proust, lettres inédites
1925: Le Préféré
1926: Le Roman d'une comédienne
1927: Le Supplice des bourgeois de Premz
1927: Ni avec toi, ni sans toi
1928: Souvenirs sur Edmond Rostand
1930: De l'amour à la sagesse, suivi de Réflexions sur Marcel Proust
1931: La Rose et le cyprès
1932: Journal d’un mari
1933: Tragédie du désir
1936: Trop belle

Posthumous

 Lettres à Paul Faure, 1898-1937, 1943

References

External links 
Biographie
Officier de la Légion d'honneur
Maison de l'écrivain

19th-century French writers
20th-century French non-fiction writers
French literary critics
Prix Femina winners
Officiers of the Légion d'honneur
Writers from Paris
1871 births
1937 deaths